Yannick Aguemon (born 11 February 1992) is a Beninese professional footballer who plays for Virton in the Belgian First Division B. He plays as either a striker or a winger. He also holds French citizenship.

Club career
Aguemon made his professional debut for Toulouse on 31 August 2011, in a Coupe de la Ligue match against Nice.

On 22 July 2022, Aguemon signed with Virton.

International
In March 2019, he received his first call-up to the Benin national football team.

He made his Benin national football team debut on 6 September 2019, in a friendly against Ivory Coast, as a starter.

References

External links 
 
 

1992 births
Living people
People from Cotonou
Beninese footballers
Benin international footballers
French footballers
France youth international footballers
Association football forwards
Beninese emigrants to France
Toulouse FC players
Vannes OC players
Royale Union Saint-Gilloise players
Oud-Heverlee Leuven players
R.E. Virton players
Ligue 1 players
Championnat National players
Belgian Pro League players
Challenger Pro League players
Beninese expatriate footballers
French expatriate footballers
Expatriate footballers in Belgium
Beninese expatriate sportspeople in Belgium
French expatriate sportspeople in Belgium